The Winslow Boy is a 1948 British drama film adaptation of Terence Rattigan's 1946 play The Winslow Boy. It was made by De Grunwald Productions and distributed by the British Lion Film Corporation. It was directed by Anthony Asquith and produced by Anatole de Grunwald with Teddy Baird as associate producer. The adapted screenplay was written by de Grunwald and Rattigan based on Rattigan's play. The music score was by William Alwyn and the cinematography by Freddie Young.

The film stars Robert Donat, Sir Cedric Hardwicke and Margaret Leighton with Basil Radford, Kathleen Harrison, Francis L. Sullivan, Marie Lohr and Jack Watling (who was also in the original West End theatre production). Also in the cast are Stanley Holloway, Mona Washbourne, Ernest Thesiger, Wilfrid Hyde-White, Lewis Casson, Cyril Ritchard and Dandy Nichols. Neil North, who plays the title role, also appeared in the 1999 film adaptation directed by David Mamet.

Background
Set against the strict codes of conduct and manners of the age, The Winslow Boy is based on a father's fight to clear his son's name. The son is expelled from Osborne Naval College for supposedly stealing a five-shilling postal order, without receiving a fair trial. His father, Arthur and sister, Catherine lead a long running legal battle, that takes them as far as the House of Commons. The play focuses on a refusal to back down in the face of injustice – the entire Winslow family, and Sir Robert Morton their barrister who represents them, make great sacrifices in order that right be done.

The play was inspired by an actual event, which set a legal precedent; the case of George Archer-Shee, a cadet at Osborne in 1908, who was accused of stealing a postal order from a fellow cadet. His elder brother, Major Martin Archer-Shee, was convinced of his innocence, and persuaded his father to engage lawyers. The most respected barrister of the day, Sir Edward Carson, was also persuaded of his innocence, and insisted on the case coming to court. On the fourth day of the trial, the Solicitor General accepted that Archer-Shee was innocent, and ultimately the family was paid compensation. George Archer-Shee died in the First World War and his name is inscribed on the war memorial in the village of Woodchester in Gloucestershire, where his parents lived. There is no real-world counterpart to the character of Catherine, although she is central to the plot of the play and films.

Plot
Arthur Winslow goes home from his job at the bank after 46 years, retiring because of arthritis. He has a normal domestic life for a middle-class family: his eldest son is at Oxford University, his daughter is a non-militant suffragette, and his youngest son is starting as a naval cadet. The next door neighbour, John, asks for his daughter's hand in marriage.

Ronnie Winslow, a cadet at the Royal Naval College, appears unexpectedly back home, soaking wet. He has a letter for his father from the college which he is too scared to give him. He is accused of the theft of a postal order for five shillings. An internal inquiry, which grants him no chance of defence, finds him guilty and his father, Arthur Winslow, is requested to remove his son from the college. Unwilling to accept the verdict, Winslow and his daughter Catherine institute their own enquiries and engage a friend and family solicitor, Desmond Curry to assist them, including the briefing of the best barrister in England at the time, Sir Robert Morton, should the case come to court. The father takes the matter to his MP, who raises it at the House of Commons under the issue within the Magna Carta that no subject of the country may be condemned without trial.

He hires Sir Robert Morton to take the case.

When the combined lawyer's bill reaches six-hundred and thirty-four pounds, well beyond his overdraft limit, the father is advised to cut his losses and abandon the case. He tells the eldest son that he is taking him out of Oxford to cut his expenses and will find him a job at the bank instead.

After aggressively interrogating Ronnie over discrepancies in his recollection and his habit of copying his friend's signature (which purportedly could have been used to steal the postal order), Sir Robert is convinced Ronnie is innocent and agrees to take the case.

The government is unwilling to allow the case to proceed but yields after heated debates in the House of Commons, and the case does come to court. Morton is able to discredit much of the supposed evidence, and the government finally withdraws the charges against Ronnie. Although the family wins the case, each of them has lost something along the way: Dickie Winslow has been forced to leave Oxford out of lack of money, Catherine loses her marriage settlement and subsequently her fiancé, John Weatherstone, and Arthur Winslow loses his health.

Cast

 Robert Donat as Sir Robert Morton
 Cedric Hardwicke as Arthur Winslow
 Basil Radford as Desmond Curry
 Margaret Leighton as Catherine Winslow
 Kathleen Harrison as Violet
 Francis L. Sullivan as Attorney General
 Marie Lohr as Grace Winslow
 Jack Watling as Dickie Winslow
 Walter Fitzgerald as First Lord
 Frank Lawton as John Watherstone
 Neil North as Ronnie Winslow
 Nicholas Hannen as Colonel Watherstone
 Hugh Dempster as Agricultural Member
 Evelyn Roberts as Hamilton MP

 W.A. Kelley as Brian O'Rourke
 Edward Lexy as First Elderly Member
 Gordon McLeod as Second Elderly Member
 Marie Michelle as Mrs. Curry
 Mona Washbourne as Miss Barnes
 Ivan Samson as Captain Flower
 Kynaston Reeves as Lord Chief Justice
 Charles Groves as Clerk of the Court
 Ernest Thesiger as Mr. Ridgeley Pierce
 Vera Cook as Violet's friend
 Stanley Holloway as Comedian
 Cyril Ritchard as Music Hall Singer
 Mary Hinton as Mrs. Elliott (uncredited)
 Noel Howlett as Mr. Williams (uncredited)
 Wilfrid Hyde-White as Wilkinson (uncredited)
 Dandy Nichols as Miss Hawkins (uncredited)

Differences from the play
Unlike the play and the David Mamet remake, the 1948 film shows the actual trial, while in other versions, the trial occurs offstage and the audience is told (but not shown) what occurred during it.

Production
The film was shot in early 1948.

The Archer-Shee case took place in 1908, while the film is set in 1912-13, just prior to World War I.

Reception

Box office
The Winslow Boy was one of the most popular films at the British box office in 1948. According to Kinematograph Weekly the 'biggest winner' at the box office in 1948 Britain was The Best Years of Our Lives with Spring in Park Lane being the best British film and "runners up" being It Always Rains on Sunday, My Brother Jonathan, Road to Rio, Miranda, An Ideal Husband, Naked City, The Red Shoes, Green Dolphin Street, Forever Amber, Life with Father, The Weaker Sex, Oliver Twist, The Fallen Idol and The Winslow Boy.

Awards
The picture was nominated for the BAFTA UN award for 1949.

Critical
Writing in The New York Times however, Bosley Crowther compared the film unfavourably to the play, "staged with superlative finish on Broadway two seasons ago," but praised the "sparkling performance" of Robert Donat, and concluded, that despite these reservations, "the screen has a striking and an inspiring picture in 'The Winslow Boy'"; The Monthly Film Bulletin noted, "It is very much a period piece, in which the middle class, with its comforts, its unlovely interiors and hideous clothes, is very much in evidence. It is too long, and would benefit by judicious cutting," although the reviewer concluded, "This is quite definitely a film to see and enjoy"; while more recently, Dennis Schwartz found the film to be "directed with great care for feeling and detail (the period settings are superb) by Anthony Asquith," and that it "proves to be excellent middle-class entertainment," and concluded by singling out Donat, "superb as the witty and elegant lawyer, who also has grit and compassion."

Among film-guide books, Leonard Maltin's Movie Guide rates it  3.5 stars (out of 4) stars, and Martin and Porter's, DVD & Video Guide rates it as 4 (out of 5) stars.

References

External links

 
 
 The Winslow Boy at BFI Screenonline

1948 films
1948 drama films
British drama films
British legal films
British courtroom films
British black-and-white films
London Films films
British films based on actual events
British films based on plays
Films based on works by Terence Rattigan
Films directed by Anthony Asquith
Films set in the 1900s
Films with screenplays by Terence Rattigan
Films with screenplays by Anatole de Grunwald
Films produced by Anatole de Grunwald
Films scored by William Alwyn
1940s English-language films
1940s British films